Langerin (CD207) is a type II transmembrane protein which is encoded by the CD207 gene in humans. It was discovered by scientists Sem Saeland and Jenny Valladeau as a main part of Birbeck granules. Langerin is C-type lectin receptor on Langerhans cells (LCs) and in mice also on dermal interstitial CD103+ dendritic cells (DC) and on resident CD8+ DC in lymph nodes.

Structure 
Langerin consists of a relatively short intracellular domain and an extracellular domain which consists of a neck-region and a carbohydrate recognition domain (CRD). The intracellular part contains a proline-rich domain (PRD). The neck region consists of alpha-helixes and mediates a formation of langerin homotrimers via a coiled-coil interaction. The homotrimers formation increases avidity and specificity of the antigen.

The CRD of langerin is similar to CRDs of other C-type lectins. It contains an EPN motif – a Glu-Pro-Asn rich region. The CRD is divided into two lobes by 2 anti-parallel beta-sheets. The upper lobe creates the primary Ca2+ dependent carbohydrates binding site. In contrast to other lectins, for instance, DC-SIGN / DC-SIGNR and MBP, langerin has only one binding site for Ca2+. In the upper lobe, there have been discovered two other binding sites by a crystallization method. These sites are not dependent on Ca2+ and their relation to the primary binding site is not completely understood. All the binding sites are flanked by positively charged amino acids (K299 and K313) which enable binding of negatively charged sulphated carbohydrates. These amino acids are not present in DC-SIGN.

Function 
Langerin is expressed in LCs which are located in the epidermis and in vaginal and oral mucosa. LCs are immune cells closely related to macrophages, but by their function, they are more like conventional dendritic cells (cDCs). Langerin recognizes and binds carbohydrates, such as mannose, fucose and N-acetylglucosamine. Thus, LCs may react against pathogens such as HIV-1, Mycobacterium leprae and Candida albicans. After pathogen binding to langerin, fate of the pathogens is not yet understood It has been proposed that the pathogen is internalised into a cytoplasmatic organelle called Birbeck granule. There, degradation and antigen processing for presentation to T-cells take place. For instance, langerin binds lipoarabinomannans of mycobacteria and inside the Birbeck granules, it contributes to the binding of the antigen to CD1a molecule. In mice, langerin is involved in antigen binding to MHC II glycoproteins and to MHC I glycoproteins during cross-presentation.

It seems an intracellular Src homology domain of langerin is important for the formation of Birbeck granules. These organelles contain Rab11a which is a molecule participating in langerin recycling. 

Langerin has similar function and structure as a DCs surface protein DC-SIGN (CD209). Both receptors bind similar antigens via the CRD, for instance Mycobacterium tuberculosis and HIV-1. However, whereas HIV-1 binding to langerin leads to the elimination of the virus, HIV-1 binding to DC-SIGN leads to infection of the cell.

Clinical significance 
In human vaginal mucosa, LCs bind the strongly glycosylated glycoprotein gp120 in HIV-1 envelope via langerin. Subsequently, the virus is internalised into the Birbeck granule where it’s degraded and processed for presentation. Thus, langerin has an antiviral activity and protects the cell against HIV-1 infection. If langerin is defect or titres of the virus are too high, the HIV-1 infection may happen.

Langerin also binds mannose, which is in the outer membrane of fungi, and beta-glucans in membrane folds of fungi. By this way, LCs can protect themselves against pathogens like Candida, Saccharomyces and Malassezia furfur. Furthermore, langerin recognizes Gal-6-sulfated lactosamine of glioblastoma. In the respiratory epithelium, LCs recognize measles virus via langerin and then, they degrade it and present it to CD4+ T-cells.

Polymorphism 
Single nucleotide polymorphism (SNP) in langerin gene may affect the stability as well as the affinity of the protein for some carbohydrates. The most common polymorphism is a replacement of alanine for valine in the 278. position (rs741326). Allelic frequency of this polymorphism is up to 48 %, but it probably does not have any influence on stability and affinity of langerin. Substitution of asparagine for aspartic acid in the 288. position leads to 10-fold reduction in the ability to recognize mannose-BSA. A substitution of tryptophane for arginine in the 264. position leads to a loss of Birbeck granules.

See also 
 Paul Langerhans
 Langerhans cell

References

Further reading

External links 
 
 

Transmembrane receptors
Proteins
Glycobiology
C-type lectins